Joseph William McGrath (1886 – 16 March 1937) was an Australian politician. He was born in Adelaide, South Australia. In 1934 he was elected to the Tasmanian House of Assembly as a Labor member for Darwin. He was re-elected in 1937 but died at Burnie before parliament resumed.

References

1886 births
1937 deaths
Members of the Tasmanian House of Assembly
Politicians from Adelaide
Australian Labor Party members of the Parliament of Tasmania
20th-century Australian politicians